is a former professional boxer who fought in the super flyweight and bantamweight divisions. He is the former WBA super flyweight champion, and former WBA bantamweight interim champion.

Childhood and early career 
Todaka was a delinquent during his teens, getting into countless street fights during his teens, and he dropped out of high school to begin boxing at a local gym in Miyazaki. Todaka got his professional license when he was 18, but was only able to make his debut in 1994, when he was 21, after having to recuperate from a back injury.

In June, 1996, Todaka challenged and won the Japanese light flyweight title. This was only his 10th professional bout. Todaka defended the title once in September, before returning it in November.

First World Title 
In 1998, Todaka transferred from his gym in Miyazaki to a larger gym located in Nagoya. WBA super flyweight champion Satoshi Iida also trained at this gym, and Todaka often fought on the undercard of Iida's title matches.

Todaka won his fight in December, 1998 to obtain a world ranking, but Iida lost to Jesus Kiki Rojas the same day to lose his WBA Super flyweight title. Todaka became the opponent for Rojas' first defense, which was scheduled for March, 1999 in Todaka's hometown, Miyazaki.

Todaka made an aggressive start, giving the veteran champion a challenging fight in the early rounds. Todaka may have been too aggressive, as a head butt opened a cut above Rojas' left eye in the 3rd round. The bleeding did not stop, and the ring doctor ended the fight in the 4th round. The rules stated that a stoppage by an unintentional head butt caused before the 4th round would become a draw, and Rojas retained his title with a draw. Both sides immediately agreed on a rematch, which took place on July 31, 1999, in Nagoya.

Rematch vs. Rojas 
In the rematch, Todaka dropped Rojas in the 2nd round with a right hook, but allowed the champion to accumulate points in the middle rounds. Todaka won back the later rounds of the fight, and the judges awarded him a close, but unanimous victory to make him the new WBA super flyweight champion.

1st defense 
The opponent for Todaka's first defense was Akihiko Nago, who was touted as the next Japanese world champion. Nago had a splendid record, winning several tournaments as an amateur, and undefeated in 15 fights as a professional.

The defense took place in Tokyo on November 7, 1999, and despite the reputation Nago had built up going into the fight, he seemed nervous in his first world title match, and was unable to land his powerful right hook. Todaka outboxed Nago for 12 rounds, and retained his title by a unanimous decision win. Nago was never able to regain his previous form after this loss.

2nd defense 
Todaka fought Yokthai Sithoar in April, 2000, for his second defense. Sithoar was a former world champion, and had fought Todaka's gymmate, Satoshi Iida, twice in world title matches.

Todaka's head was repeatedly snapped back from Sithoar's punches in the early and middle rounds, but in Round 8, Todaka's right hook caught Sithoar squarely in the head, just before the round was finished. Sithoar managed to stay standing, but could only stagger back to his own corner. Todaka took advantage of the opportunity, and pounded the Sithoar in the 9th and 10th rounds, and in the 11th round, he sent Sithoar reeling back to the ropes with a powerful punch. Sithoar could not get himself off the ropes, and the referee stopped the fight, to give Todaka an 11th-round TKO victory. Todaka was losing on all three of scorecards at the time of the stoppage.

Defeat 
Almost half a year after his second defense, Todaka fought Leo Gamez in October 2000. Gamez had won world titles in three different weight classes, but it was expected to be an easy fight for Todaka, considering that Gamez was past his prime.

However, Todaka was not his usual self in the ring, as he seemed unable to see any of Gamez's punches. He was battered throughout the fight, before being knocked out by a powerful right hook from Gamez in the 7th round.

It was later revealed that Todaka was being treated for multiple sclerosis before the fight, which explains why he had so much trouble seeing Gamez's punches. In addition to his eye injury, Todaka also broke his jaw in the fight, which forced him into a long period of inactivity. He had held the WBA title for one year and two months, and it took him one year and five months to fully recover from his injuries.

Revenge match 
Todaka spent all of 2001 to recover, and finally made his comeback in March 2002, winning three fights to regain his world ranking. On October 4, 2003, he met Leo Gamez again, for the WBA bantamweight interim title. It was three years since their last meeting, and the two traded blows for 12 rounds. In the end, Todaka won a close 2-1 split decision victory, avenging his previous loss, and becoming the 5th Japanese boxer to win world titles in two different weight classes.

Last fight and retirement 
Todaka had planned on having a unification bout with the WBA bantamweight champion, but was unable to come to terms with promoters, and decided to make a defense instead, which was set on March 6, 2004, against Julio Zarate. Todaka had turned 30 in 2004, and no longer possessed the physical strength needed to compete at a world level. He spent the entire fight trying to catch up to the challenger, and lost by unanimous decision to lose his interim title after only five months. He announced his retirement shortly after the fight. His professional record was 21-4-1 (10KOs).

Post retirement 
Todaka currently trains young fighters at the Todaka boxing gym, located in Tokyo, Japan.

See also 
 List of WBA world champions
 List of Japanese boxing world champions
 Boxing in Japan

References

External links 
 

|-

1973 births
Bantamweight boxers
Living people
People from Miyazaki Prefecture
World Boxing Association champions
World boxing champions
Japanese male boxers